Prekadin is a village in the municipality of Prokuplje, Serbia. According to the 2002 census, the village has a population of 167 people. In 1878 after the Congress Of Berlin, the Albanian population was either killed by Serbian troops or deported by force to Kosovo, mainly to the region of Ferizaj. Today, the Albanians in Ferizaj are called "Muhaxherre" which basically means muslim refugees.

References

Populated places in Toplica District